Notre Dame Catholic Secondary School is a high school located in Ajax, Ontario, Canada. It was opened in 2001 along with its twin school J. Clarke Richardson Collegiate. Notre Dame and Richardson share the same building, with Notre Dame occupying the north wing and Richardson the south. The cafeteria is the physical divider between the two high schools and is shared by both, along with the theatre and the football field. The layouts of Notre Dame and Richardson are essentially identical except for a few minor differences in the shop classrooms and the gymnasiums.

History
The school was opened in September 2001 as the second Catholic high school in Ajax. It was opened along with J. Clarke Richardson as a "mega school"—a Catholic high school and a public high school sharing the same building. Notre Dame was built amidst a large amount of suburban development, which contributes much of the student body. Since the opening of the school, there has been a lot of residential and commercial development in the area.

Feeder schools
The school's students generally come from the following Catholic elementary schools:
 St. Andre Bessette Catholic School
 St. Teresa of Calcutta Catholic School
 St. Catherine of Siena Catholic School
 St. Patrick Catholic School
 St. Josephine Bakhita Catholic School

Notable alumni
Jessica Tyler - Actress,Singer
Sabrina Cruz - Youtuber
Dayne St. Clair - Soccer player
Pat Gregoire - TSN Broadcaster 
Connor McMichael - Hockey Player

References

High schools in the Regional Municipality of Durham
Ajax, Ontario
Educational institutions established in 2001
2001 establishments in Ontario